Henderson Lovelace Lanham (September 14, 1888 – November 10, 1957) was an American politician and lawyer.

Lanham was born in Rome, Georgia. He attended the University of Georgia in Athens where he was a member of the Sigma Chi fraternity and the Phi Kappa Literary Society. Lanham graduated with a Bachelor of Arts in 1910 and Bachelor of Law degree with honors in 1911. He also graduated from the Harvard Graduate School of Arts and Sciences in 1912.

Lanham served as the chairman of the board of education in Rome in 1918 and 1919. In 1929, he was elected to the Georgia House of Representatives and served until 1933. Lanham was re-elected to that body in 1937 and served until 1940. He was elected as the solicitor general of Rome judicial circuit from 1941 to 1946.

Later in 1946 Lanham was elected as a Democrat to the U.S. House of Representatives and served until he was killed in an automobile accident in 1957 in Rome. His car was struck by a train. He was buried in Myrtle Hill Cemetery in that same city.

During a Congressional hearing in 1947, Lanham was one of several members of Congress to express concern about the newfound CIA becoming dangerous. He asked, "Do you feel there is any danger of the Central Intelligence Agency Division becoming a Gestapo, or anything of that sort?"

A staunch segregationist, in 1956, Lanham signed "The Southern Manifesto." He was cited in the UN petition We Charge Genocide: The Crime of Government Against the Negro People as an example of white supremacy in government, mocking William L. Patterson in Congress and stating "We gotta keep the black apes down." He then rushed at Patterson, attempting to assault him.

See also 
 List of United States Congress members who died in office (1950–99)

References 

 
 History of the University of Georgia, Thomas Walter Reed, Imprint: Athens, Georgia : University of Georgia, ca. 1949 pp.2247,2264

1888 births
1957 deaths
American segregationists
Harvard University alumni
Georgia (U.S. state) lawyers
Democratic Party members of the Georgia House of Representatives
University of Georgia alumni
Railway accident deaths in the United States
Road incident deaths in Georgia (U.S. state)
Democratic Party members of the United States House of Representatives from Georgia (U.S. state)
20th-century American politicians
20th-century American lawyers